Phineas Densmore Gurley (November 12, 1816 – September 30, 1868) was Chaplain of the United States Senate and pastor of New York Avenue Presbyterian Church in Washington, D.C.

Early life

Gurley was born in Hamilton, New York, on November 12, 1816, the son of Phineas and Elizabeth (née Fox) Gurley. Gurley graduated from Union College in Schenectady, New York, in 1837, with the highest honors of his class, and from Princeton Theological Seminary in 1840.

Ministry

Gurley served First Presbyterian Church in Indianapolis, Indiana, (1840–1849) and First Presbyterian Church,  in Dayton, Ohio, (1850–1854). In 1854, Gurley accepted a call from the F Street Church in Washington, D. C., which in 1859 was united with the Second Presbyterian Church, to become the New York Avenue Presbyterian Church. Gurley continued to be the pastor of the merged congregation until his death.

In 1859 he was chosen Chaplain of the United States Senate; one of fourteen Presbyterians to hold that office, to date. Gurley numbered among his worshiping congregation President Abraham Lincoln and Mary Todd Lincoln. Lincoln was a pew holder and regular attender but not a member of the church. Gurley and his wife were frequent guests at the White House. Gurley was at Lincoln's deathbed and accompanied Mrs. Lincoln when she informed her son, Tad, of Lincoln's death. Gurley later compared the experience of the assassination with a major battle: I "felt as though I had been engaged all night in a terrible Battle and had just strength enough to drag myself off the field." He preached his funeral sermon on April 19, 1865 at the White House, lauding Lincoln for his commitment to American ideals:

Gurley had a beautiful singing voice (his mother was a professional singer) and was a powerful speaker.

Gurley took an active part in the negotiations that resulted in the union of the Old School and New School branches of the Presbyterian Church. Gurley continued to serve as pastor of the New York Avenue Presbyterian Church until his death in Washington, D.C., on September 30, 1868. He spent the last two years as moderator of the Presbyterian Church.

Personal life
Gurley married Emma Brooks on October 9, 1840. Both were natives of New York. Their children were: Frances Mary Gurley, William Brooks Gurley, Hosea Mellville Gurley, Charles Lawrence Gurley and Emma Harrison Gurley.

Archival collections
The Presbyterian Historical Society in Philadelphia, Pennsylvania, has a collection of Gurley's sermons, correspondences, and photographs.

References

Additional references
mrlincolnswhitehouse.org
David Rankin Barbee, "President Lincoln and Doctor Gurley", The Abraham Lincoln Quarterly, March 1948, Volume. V, No. 1.
Allen C. Guelzo, Abraham Lincoln: Redeemer President, p. 321.
DeWitt Jones, Lincoln and the Preachers, p. 37.

Further reading

1816 births
1868 deaths
Chaplains of the United States Senate
Presbyterian Church in the United States of America ministers
American Presbyterians
People associated with the assassination of Abraham Lincoln
People from Hamilton, New York
Union College (New York) alumni
Princeton Theological Seminary alumni
19th-century American clergy